The 22nd Producers Guild of America Awards (also known as 2011 Producers Guild Awards), honoring the best film and television producers of 2010, were held at The Beverly Hilton Hotel in Beverly Hills, California on January 22, 2011. The nominations were announced on January 4, 2011.

Winners and nominees

Film

Television

David O. Selznick Achievement Award in Theatrical Motion Pictures
Scott Rudin

Milestone Award
James Cameron

Norman Lear Achievement Award in Television
Tom Hanks and Gary Goetzman

Stanley Kramer Award
Sean Penn

Vanguard Award
RealD

Visionary Award
Laura Ziskin

References

 2010
2010 film awards
2010 guild awards
2010 television awards